Chivilingo Hydroelectric Plant is a historic hydroelectric power station located  south of Lota, Chile. It came on line in 1897, and was the first hydroelectric plant in Chile and the second in South America. The plant is now registered on the list of IEEE Milestones in electrical engineering, and open to visitors.

Chief engineer William E. Raby formulated its initial plans, which settled upon the production of alternating current to feed three phase motors, powered by waterfalls of the nearby Chivilingo River.

Construction work began in 1896, with civil works and the aqueduct built by the mining company, and hydraulic and electric engineering performed by Consolidated Co. of North America and Schuckert & Co. of Nürnberg, Germany. Two Pelton turbines powered two alternators of  each (315 horsepower, 400 volts, 360 amperes, 50 Hertz).

The Chivilingo plant was in operation from 1897 to 1975, in its later years as part of the Chilean Central Interconnected System. In 1998 it was transferred by the city of Lota to the Fundación Chile which now operates tours for visitors.

Notes

References 
 Chivilingo Hydroelectric Power Station

External links

Energy infrastructure completed in 1897
Energy infrastructure in Biobío Region
Hydroelectric power stations in Chile